The Global Library of Women's Medicine is a free and publicly available resource of clinical information on women’s health launched on 20 November 2008. Its purpose is to provide expert support to obstetricians, gynecologists, and reproductive health professionals.

The site is contributed to by over 750 specialists and its main feature is a large and continually growing library of specially commissioned chapters on most aspects of women's medicine, constantly reviewed and updated. This has recently been supported by the introduction of an online Learning Assessment option, providing Certificates of Study Completion plus Continuing Professional Development awards (from FIGO - International Federation of Gynaecology and Obstetrics) for those who undertake this assessment successfully 

The site also includes an extensive section on Safer Motherhood providing practical guidance for nurses, midwives and other healthcare workers  and it offers a free Safer Motherhood app so that these resources can accompany care providers during their daily work. Whilst the resources provided by The Global Library are designed to be relevant everywhere, there is an additional special focus on the needs of LMICs.

The Global Library is run as a not-for-profit undertaking and it accepts no advertising or commercial sponsorship; its income is dependent on personal donations and unrestricted educational grants.

The editor-in-chief is Peter von Dadelszen, Professor of Global Women’s Health, King's College London. 

The website has been certified to be "fully compliant with the HONcode standard for trustworthy health information" by the Health On the Net Foundation.

Welfare of Women 
The Welfare of Women global health programme is a new initiative by The Global Library of Women’s Medicine and is an attempt to try and provide health professionals globally with immediate access to the latest, state-of-the-art, information on women’s health and on the ‘best practice’ management of relevant clinical conditions.

In particular the programme tries to address the main factors that have, in the past, often limited the effective transmission of such information to those who need it most by using a range of new technologies and approaches in a carefully integrated manner.  The factors addressed include language (the programme is multi-lingual), distribution (using the internet AND mobile phone technologies combined to maximise coverage, interactivity (offering options for reader interaction – not just passive study, outreach (global distribution, assisted by local networks and national  Societies, adaptability (continuous updating, adaptation and extension) and focus (provided at three separate levels to meet differing needs of readers.

In this way it is hoped that this programme may make a modest but practical contribution to the work of many dedicated healthcare professionals around the world.

References

External links

Medical websites
Women's health
Maternal health
Medical literature
Bibliographic databases and indexes